Georgia Tbilisi TV Broadcasting Tower (tbilisis teleandza) is a free-standing tower structure used for communications purposes. The tower is located in Tbilisi, Georgia  and was built in 1972. The preceding structure, built in 1955, was moved to the vicinity of the city of Gori.

The tower is operated by "Georgian Teleradiocenter", that was established 1955. Communication systems on the tower include regular broadcast, MMDS, pager and cellular, commercial TV, and amateur radio repeater. The tower is 274.5 m (901 ft) high on a mountain at 719.2 m (2,360 feet) above sea level.

See also
 List of tallest freestanding steel structures
 Lattice tower
 List of towers
 List of masts

Notes

External links

 Information and pictures from Radiomap.eu
 

Towers completed in 1972
Buildings and structures in Tbilisi
Communications in Georgia (country)
Towers built in the Soviet Union
Communication towers in Georgia (country)
Radio masts and towers in Europe
1972 establishments in Georgia (country)